AD 57 (LVII) was a common year starting on Saturday (link will display the full calendar) of the Julian calendar. At the time, it was known as the Year of the Consulship of Caesar and Piso (or, less frequently, year 810 Ab urbe condita). The denomination AD 57 for this year has been used since the early medieval period, when the Anno Domini calendar era became the prevalent method in Europe for naming years.

Events

By place

Roman Empire 
 Envoys from Cilicia come to Rome to accuse their late governor, Cossutianus Capito, of extortion; the Roman Senate is supported in the case by Publius Clodius Thrasea Paetus.
 Emperor Nero becomes a Roman consul again.
 In Britain, Quintus Veranius Nepos becomes governor in place of Aulus Didius Gallus. He begins a campaign against the Silures of south Wales.
 Also in Britain Venutius begins his rebellion against his wife Cartimandua.

Asia 
 Emperor Guang Wu grants Nakoku (located around modern-day Fukuoka City) a golden seal, being the oldest evidence of writing in Japan. In return King Na sends an envoy to China.
 March 29 – Guang Wu dies after a 32-year reign and is succeeded by his son Han Mingdi.
 Accession of King Talhae as Korean ruler of Silla.

By topic

Religion 
 Paul of Tarsus writes his Second Epistle to the Corinthians and his Epistle to the Romans (probable date).

Births 
 Han Zhang Di, Chinese emperor (d. AD 88)

Deaths 
 March 29 – Guang Wu, Chinese emperor (b. 5 BC)
 Quintus Veranius, Roman consul and general
 Yuri, Korean ruler of Silla

References 

0057

als:50er#57